Aubigné may refer to:
Agrippa d'Aubigné (1552–1630), a French poet
Constant d'Aubigné (1585–1647), a French nobleman
Françoise d'Aubigné, marquise de Maintenon (1635–1719), the second wife of Louis XIV
Jean-Henri Merle d'Aubigné (1794–1872), a Swiss Protestant minister and historian of the Reformation

Aubigné may also refer to the following places in France:
 Aubigné, Ille-et-Vilaine
 Aubigné, Deux-Sèvres
 Aubigné-Racan, Sarthe
 Aubigné-sur-Layon, Maine-et-Loire